Fursonas is a documentary film about the furry fandom, directed by Dominic Rodriguez.

Synopsis 
Fursonas, a documentary film, follows a few furries as a social commentary of the fandom, its stigmas and how it is perceived through sensational media coverage.

Production 
Production of Fursonas began while Rodriguez was majoring in filmmaking at Point Park University. The film was originally a senior thesis project. Also involved were Olivia Vaughn and Christine Meyer. Originally a 12-minute short film,  the film was expanded into a feature length documentary when the crew was awarded a 10,000 dollar grant from The Sprout Fund in 2013. In 2014 Christine Meyer and Olivia Vaughn became interns at the Animal Media Group, a production and visual effects studio. Previously, Animal had produced the documentary “Blood Brother”, which won two awards at the 2013 Sundance Film Festival. Animal allowed the crew to use their facilities to edit the footage of ‘Fursonas’.  Later, Animal offered to be the official production company for the documentary.

Premiere 
The documentary premiered at the 2016 Slamdance Film Festival.

Reception 
Fursonas was well-received, winning a "Spirit of Slamdance" award at its debut film festival. Both Variety and Deadline Hollywood featured positive reviews of Fursonas on their websites.

Cast 
 Boomer The Dog
 Freya
 Kato
 Grix
 Diezel Raccoon
 Bandit
 Skye
 Chew Fox
 Tom Cat
 Varka

References 

http://www.forcesofgeek.com/2016/01/slamdance-ff-fursonas-review.html
http://www.hammertonail.com/film-festivals/fursonas-movie-review/
http://www.ocweekly.com/film/fursonas-takes-on-the-secretive-world-of-furriesand-the-movements-furrious-fuhrer-7114105
https://www.flayrah.com/6483/opinion-fursonas-film-we-need
https://www.flayrah.com/6560/interview-fursonas-documentary-director-dominic-rodriguez-video-wolf

External links 
 
 

Documentary films about fandom
Furry fandom
American independent films
2016 directorial debut films
2010s English-language films
2010s American films